Mitofusin-1 is a protein that in humans is encoded by the MFN1 gene.

The protein encoded by this gene is a mediator of mitochondrial fusion. This protein and mitofusin 2 are homologs of the Drosophila protein fuzzy onion (Fzo). They are mitochondrial membrane proteins that interact with each other to facilitate mitochondrial targeting.

References

Further reading